Tropical Storm Andrea brought flooding to Cuba, the Yucatan Peninsula, and portions of the East Coast of the United States in June 2013. The first tropical cyclone and named storm of the annual hurricane season, Andrea originated from an area of low pressure in the eastern Gulf of Mexico on June 5. Despite strong wind shear and an abundance of dry air, the storm strengthened while initially heading north-northeastward. Later on June 5, it re-curved northeastward and approached the Big Bend region of Florida. A few hours later, the storm weakened slightly and made landfall near Steinhatchee, Florida later that day. It began losing tropical characteristics while tracking across Florida and Georgia. Andrea transitioned into an extratropical cyclone over South Carolina on June 7, though the remnants continued to move along the East Coast of the United States, until being absorbed by another extratropical system offshore Maine on June 10.

In Cuba, the storm brought flooding, especially in Pinar del Río Province. Over 1,000 people fled their homes, mainly along the Cuyaguateje River. A tornado was also spawned in the area, damaging three homes. In Florida, the storm brought heavy rainfall to some areas, causing localized flooding. There were nine tornadoes in Florida, the worst of which touched down in The Acreage and downed power lines and trees, causing significant roof damage to several houses; there was also one injury. After Andrea transition into an extratropical storm, the remnants that also spawned one tornado in North Carolina, though damage was minor. Additionally, minor flooding was reported in some areas of the Northeastern United States. Three fatalities occurred due to weather-related traffic accidents in Virginia and New Jersey. There was a direct death reported after a surfer in South Carolina went missing and was presumed to have drowned. The remnants of Andrea also brought gusty winds to Atlantic Canada, causing thousands of power outages in Nova Scotia and New Brunswick.

Meteorological history

At the end of May 2013, a broad and diffuse cyclonic disturbance developed over eastern Mexico and northern Central America, incorporating the remnants of eastern Pacific Hurricane Barbara. As a tropical wave approached from the east, an inverted trough developed on the northern edge of the active region on June 2, setting the stage for the formation of a weak surface low pressure system over the southern Gulf of Mexico the next day. The National Hurricane Center (NHC) began monitoring the system in their Tropical Weather Outlooks, and bulletins were issued every six hours regarding the probability of tropical cyclone formation within 48 hours. A nearby upper trough created unfavorable conditions for tropical cyclogenesis, subjecting the low to wind shear and abundant dry air that kept it indistinct and disorganized. On June 5, the environment became less hostile, and the system began to improve in structure.

Due to somewhat unfavorable conditions, significant strengthening was initially considered unlikely. Thereafter, unfavorable conditions, including dry air entrainment caused the storm to weaken slightly.

After moving inland on June 6, the NHC noted that extratropical transition was likely within 24 hours and that it "could occur sooner if the convective structure does not improve." By later on June 7, most of the convection became displaced to the northwest due to dry air. Around that time, the storm began accelerating northeastward at  due to an approaching mid-latitude trough. Based on ground observations and Doppler radar, the system transitioned into an extratropical cyclone at 1800 UTC on June 7, while located over northeastern South Carolina. The remaining thunderstorms around Andrea became indistinguishable from those associated with a frontal zone over North Carolina. Due to a policy created in response to Hurricane Sandy, the NHC continued to issue advisories on the remnants of Andrea as it remained a threat to the East Coast of the United States. On June 8, it moved rapidly northeastward across the Mid-Atlantic and New England. Because gale-force winds were located well to the southeast of the center, the NHC ceased advisories on the remnants of Andrea. Upon reaching the Gulf of Maine, the extratropical remnants of Andrea were absorbed by another extratropical low pressure area around 0000 UTC on June 10.

Preparations

Multiple tropical cyclone warnings and watches were posted along both the Atlantic and Gulf coasts of the United States in association with Tropical Storm Andrea. At 2200 UTC on June 5, a tropical storm warning was issued from Boca Grande to the mouth of the Ochlockonee River in Florida. Additionally, a tropical storm watch was put into effect for Flagler Beach, Florida to Surf City, North Carolina. At 0900 UTC on June 6, the tropical storm warning was extended from the mouth of the Ochlockonee River to Indian Pass, Florida. Simultaneously, another tropical storm warning was issued from Flagler Beach, Florida to Cape Charles Light in Virginia. Early on June 7, the tropical storm warning on the Gulf Coast of Florida was expanded to include Boca Grande to the Steinhatchee River in Florida, before being canceled a few hours later. At 0900 UTC on June 7, the tropical storm warning from Flagler Beach to Surf City was modified to Altamaha River, Georgia to Cape Charles Light. Throughout that day, the tropical storm warning was progressively retracted northward, with the southern terminal being at the Savannah River in Georgia at 1200 UTC, the Santee River in South Carolina at 1500 UTC, the Little River Inlet in South Carolina at 1800 UTC, and finally Surf City at 2100 UTC. Early on June 8, all tropical cyclone warnings and watches were discontinued.

The United States Coast Guard urged marine interests and boaters in Florida, Georgia, and South Carolina to take precaution to protect their lives and vessels. In Florida, the Gulf Islands National Seashore closed their campground and a beach front road. Additionally, several states parks were closed and campers were evacuated. At Pensacola Beach, condominium associations asked residents to remove furniture from high balconies due to the anticipation of strong winds. A state of emergency was issued for Taylor County, where two shelters were opened.

Impact

Becoming a tropical storm on June 5, Andrea marked the fourth consecutive season with a named storm in the month of June, following Hurricane Alex in 2010, Tropical Storm Arlene in 2011, and Hurricane Chris and Tropical Storm Debby in 2012. This was over a month earlier than the 1966–2009 average date of the first named storm, July 9.

In Cuba, the Civil Defense issued a weather alarm for Pinar del Río Province from June 5 to June 6. There was also a lower-level "alert" in the adjacent provinces of Artemisa and Mayabeque. Over 1,000 people fled their homes due to flooding, especially along the Cuyaguateje River in Pinar del Río Province. Of the 24 dams in Pinar del Río Province, six had already filled by June 5. The disturbance spawned a tornado in that area, which damaged three homes.

Florida

A total of 10 tornadoes were spawned in Florida. Near Myakka City, a tornado damaged the roofs of three single family homes, six pole barns, and four outbuildings. One horse and six chickens were killed, and another horse and two dogs were injured. Significant piles of debris and downed power lines covered State Road 70 in Myakka City. Damage was estimated at $50,000. Another twister spawned in Sun City Center downed trees and damaged lanais, fascia and shingles. Damage reached approximately $36,000.

Andrea dropped locally heavy rainfall in some areas of West Central Florida, with a Community Collaborative Rain, Hail and Snow Network (CoCoRaHS) station observing  inches of precipitation near Chiefland. Minor street flooding was reported in several counties. Near the city of Coachman, the weight of saturated leaves on the roof of a dog kennel at the Pinellas County Humane Society caused a large section of the roof to collapse. In North Florida, the storm spawned a tornado at the Naval Station Mayport in Jacksonville. A number of "non-critical" structures suffered minor impact, while other buildings experienced damaged roofs and broken windows. Another tornado was spawned on Amelia Island in Fernandina Beach, though it caused minimal damage.

Of the ten tornadoes in Florida, three were spawned in the southern portions of the state. In The Acreage, an EF-1 tornado caused minor to moderate roof damage to several homes, mainly in the form of shingles and roof covering torn off. Numerous trees were uprooted or snapped near the trunk, along with several branches falling; this resulted in broken windows in several homes. At one home, the garage door was damaged, causing the door to blow in, which in turn led to the roof being damaged above the garage. An 85-year-old woman was injured after being struck by a falling branch of an oak tree, which broke through her bedroom window. A few vehicles were moved from their original locations, while a  boat was flipped on its side. Another tornado in Belle Glade damaged an awning and downed trees and several power lines. Further south, a tornado touched down in Broward County and entered Palm Beach County before lifting back up; it resulted in no damage.

A convective band associated with Tropical Storm Andrea moved slowly across South Florida, prompting flash flood warnings for Broward and Miami-Dade County Counties. Roads became impassable in the Waterways community in Aventura, leaving over 50 vehicles disabled. In nearby Golden Beach, hundreds of people became stranded in their vehicles, according to city officials. At the Biscayne Bay Campus of Florida International University,  of rain was observed. A number of stalled vehicles and impassable roads were reported in North Miami, while 24 families were forced to evacuate due to flooding. Several vehicles became disabled after retention ponds overflowed.

Elsewhere in North America

Along the coast of Alabama, 13 swimmers were rescued due to strong rip currents. In Georgia, the storm brought gusty winds to the coast, reaching  at Fort Pulaski. Wind damage was minor, limited to mostly downed trees and power lines in several counties; in Chatham County, a falling tree struck a house. Generally light rainfall was reported across much of southern and eastern Georgia, though up to  fell near Richmond Hill. In Chatham County, a portion of U.S. Route 25 was temporarily closed due to flooding. A surfer in Horry County went missing and was later presumed to have drowned. In several counties along the coast or just inland, trees and power lines were downed. Andrea dropped light rainfall in the state, peaking at  near Cordova.

The storm brought significant amounts of rainfall to North Carolina in short periods of time, with a peak amount of  near Cameron. In Raleigh,  of rain fell in 24 hours, which broke the highest daily precipitation record for the city. Additionally, this total exceeded the average rainfall amount for the month of June. Many streams, creeks, and river overflowed in eastern North Carolina, resulting in numerous street closures in several counties. The Crabtree Valley Mall in Raleigh was closed after the parking lots became inundated. A number of low-lying and creek-side communities in Apex, Cary, Clayton, Durham, and Raleigh were flooded. A tornado was spawned near Varnamtown, where it downed several trees and damaged a large storage building.

Several roads in Accomack County were left impassable due to high water. One indirect death occurred due to a car accident in southwestern Virginia on June 7. Poor drainage in some areas resulted in multiple road closures in Caroline and Talbot counties, the latter of which reported about 20 roads shutdown. Flash flooding occurred in areas of poor drainage, causing several road closures, especially in central Delaware. In Delaware County, flooding was reporting along the Chester Creek.

The heavy precipitation resulted in traffic jams and caused flooding along the Millstone and Raritan rivers. Three car accidents were blamed on the storm, two of which were fatal. Numerous roads flooded across the state, leading to several high-water rescues. Overflowing rivers and streams in Bergen and Union counties flooded low-lying and poor drainage areas. Winds of  downed some trees and power lines, leaving 500–2,000 residences without power. A plane traveling from Palm Beach, Florida to Boston, Massachusetts had to make an emergency landing at Newark Liberty International Airport after being struck by lightning. In New York,  fell at Central Park in New York City in only a few hours, causing flash flooding in some areas. Train 3 on the New York City Subway briefly suspended service from 96th Street station to the 148th Street station.

About  of precipitation fell throughout Rhode Island, flooding many streets, several basements, and stranding a number of cars, particularly in Providence County. An estimated  of precipitation fell in eastern Massachusetts. A number of roads were inundated in Bristol County, including Routes 24 and 79 and the ramps onto Interstate 95. Several basements were flooded in New Bedford, while several streets were flooded or left impassable. Elsewhere in New England, light rainfall was observed in Maine, New Hampshire, and Vermont.

As a post-tropical cyclone, Andrea brought rain and gale-force winds to Atlantic Canada. Officials closed the Confederation Bridge to high-profile vehicles due to the blustery conditions. More than 4,000 customers in Nova Scotia and parts of New Brunswick lost power as the storm moved through on June 8.

See also

 Tropical Storm Alberto (2006)
 Tropical Storm Barry (2007)
 Tropical Storm Colin (2016)
 Timeline of the 2013 Atlantic hurricane season

References

External links

 National Hurricane Center's advisory archive on Andrea
 National Hurricane Center's graphical archive on Andrea

2013 Atlantic hurricane season
Hurricanes in Florida
Hurricanes in Georgia (U.S. state)
Andrea
Andrea